Azam TV is an East African direct broadcast satellite service owned by Bakhresa Group based in Dar es salaam, Tanzania. Launched in 2013, the service provides audio, radio and television channels services to subscribers, mostly in Tanzania, Malawi, Rwanda, Zimbabwe, Uganda and Kenya.

Tanzanian Premier League
In 2021, Azam TV secured the Tanzania Mainland Premier League (Tanzanian Premier League) broadcasting rights in a deal worth Tsh225.6 billion. The deal gave it the sole rights of the top-tier for the next 10 years following the sponsorship renewal with Tanzania Football Federation.

References

External links
Azam TV Official website
Azam TV at YouTube
Azam TV at Instagram

Television in Tanzania
Television in Kenya
Television in Uganda
Direct broadcast satellite services
Television channels and stations established in 2013
Mass media companies established in 2013